Henryk Frymarkiewicz (10 July 1910 – 6 August 1975) was a Polish footballer. He played in one match for the Poland national football team in 1934.

References

External links
 

1910 births
1975 deaths
Polish footballers
Poland international footballers
Place of birth missing
Association football goalkeepers
ŁKS Łódź players